Zinc finger and BTB domain-containing protein 17 is a protein that in humans is encoded by the ZBTB17 gene.

Interactions 

ZBTB17 has been shown to interact with TOPBP1, Host cell factor C1 and Myc.

References

Further reading

External links 
 
 

Transcription factors